This is the history of Transnistria, officially the Pridnestrovian Moldavian Republic (PMR), is an unrecognised breakaway state that is internationally recognised as part of Moldova. Transnistria controls most of the narrow strip of land between the Dniester river and the Moldovan–Ukrainian border, as well as some land on the other side of the river's bank.
See also the history of Europe.

Before 1792

Antiquity
In ancient history, the area was inhabited by Thracian and Scythian tribes. Pliny the Elder names the Tyragetae, a Getae tribe living on an island of the Dniester (ancient name "Tyras"), the Axiacae living along the Tiligul River (ancient "Axiaces") and the Crobyzi, a Thracian tribe living beyond the Dniester.

At the mouth of the river, the Ancient Greeks of Miletus founded around 600 BC a colony named Tyras, which was located outside present-day Transnistria. It fell under the dominion of native kings whose names appear on its coins, and it was destroyed by the Dacians about 50 BC.

In 56 AD Tyras had been restored by the Romans and henceforth formed part of the province of Lower Moesia, which also included Dobruja (part of Romania) and northeastern Bulgaria. Romans settled colonists in Tyras and maintained some legionaries in the area (even in Olbia) until the 4th century.

Historian Theodore Mommsen wrote that "Moldavia and the south half of Bessarabia as well as the whole of Wallachia were incorporated in the Roman Empire".

All these facts confirm the creation of defensive earth dykes (called Trajan Walls) from the Prut river to the Tyras area, in order to defend these new territories of the Roman Empire. Furthermore, Mommsen wrote, "Bessarabia is intersected by a double barrier-line which, running from the Pruth to the Dniester, ends at Tyra and appears to proceeds from the Romans".

In the Late Roman period, the extent of control and military occupation over territory north of the Danube in actual Bessarabia remains controversial. One Roman fort (Pietroasa de Jos), well beyond the Danubian Limes and near actual Moldavia, would seem to have been occupied in the 4th century AD, as were bridge-head forts (Sucidava, Barboşi, and the unlocated Constantiniana Daphne) along the left bank of the river. In this Roman fort, built by Constantine I, researchers have found even a thermae building in the 1980s.

In the 4th century the Goths conquered Tyras and Olbia on the coast, but the final destruction of those merchant cities happened with the Attila invasions one century later. The area of Transnistria was under the rule of the Goths, who, in the 4th century, were divided into the "Tervingi" and "Greuthungi" tribes, (traditionally identified with the Visigoths and Ostrogoths), the border between them being on the Dniester river.

Wallachian and Slavic settlement
Transnistria was an early crossroads of people and cultures, including the South Slavs, who reached it in the 6th century. Some East Slavic tribes (Ulichs and Tivertsy) may have lived in it, but they were pushed further north by Turkic nomads such as Pechenegs and the Cumans. In the 10th century, the "Volohove" (Vlachs, i.e. Romanians) are mentioned in the area in the Primary Chronicle. Indeed, some academics believe that on the coast between the Dniester and Danube rivers there was a romance speaking community until 1050 AD, that was destroyed by the Pechenegs

From Kievan Rus' to the Polish–Lithuanian Commonwealth

Transnistria was inhabited mainly by the Cumans and wars against them may have brought the territory under the control of the Kievan Rus' at times around the 11th century. It became a formal part of the Grand Duchy of Lithuania in the 15th century. While most of today's Moldova came into the Ottoman orbit at this time, much of Transnistria remained a part of the Polish–Lithuanian Commonwealth until the Second Partition of Poland in 1793 as part of Bratslav Voivodeship, save for short periods of Cossack Hetmanate in 1648-1672 as Bratslav Regiment and Ottoman Empire in 1672-1684 as Podolia Eyalet.

On the coast the Byzantines built a fortress in the area of the destroyed Tyras and named it Asprocastron ("White Castle" – a meaning kept in several languages, like in actual Ukrainian Bilhorod). In the 14th century the city was controlled and renovated by the Republic of Genoa, that established there a call and a counter trade until the Ottoman conquest. A small part of the population of this city escaped the Turkish invasion founding up north a small village that later become the actual city of Tyraspol, now capital of Transnistria.

Meanwhile, the Crimean Khanate conquered the southern portion of Transnistria south of the Iagorlîc/Jagorlyk river, which was included in 1504 in the region of Yedisan and was under the control of the Ottoman Empire until 1792. The northern part (North of the Iagorlîc river) remained under the control of the Grand Duchy of Lithuania, as part of the historical region of Podolia (part of the Polish Kingdom until 1793). The border between the two states was set on a brook known in Moldavian chronicles as Iahurlîc and in Polish source as Jahorlik or Jahorłyk (today Iagorlîc, in Transnistria).

Moldavia started from its nucleus in Bukovina and soon reached Prut and by the end of the 14th century the Dnister, which was set as their easternmost border.

While there were some Moldavian military incursions beyond the Dniester in the 15th century, the earliest written evidence of Moldavian settlement beyond the Dnister dates from the 16th century: a 1541 letter written by Suleiman the Magnificent to Polish Sigismund II Augustus says that some of his Moldavian subjects plundered Tighina and Akkerman and then retreated and settled in the Polish territory.

Modern Era
While the territory beyond the Dniester was never politically part of Moldavia, some areas of today's Transnistria were owned by Moldavian boyars, being given by the Moldavian rulers. The earliest surviving deeds referring to lands beyond the Dnister date from the 16th century. Moldavian chronicle Grigore Ureche mentions that in 1584, some Moldavian villages from beyond the Dnister in the Polish territory were attacked and plundered by Cossacks. Many Moldovans were members of Cossacks units, two of them, Ioan Potcoavă and Dănilă Apostol, were hetmans of Ukraine.

Along with a nomadic Nogai Tatar population, the area was populated by Romanians, Ukrainians, Poles, and Russians. In 1927, Columbia University Professor Charles Upson Clark, wrote that the lower Dniester was "an almost purely Romanian stream" since 1792.

Russian Empire

In 1792, the southern part of Transnistria was ceded by Ottoman Empire to the Russian Empire whereas northern part (north of the Iagorlîc River) was annexed in 1793 in Second Partition of Poland. At that time, the population was sparse and the Russian Empire encouraged large migrations into the region, including people of Ukrainian, Romanian, Polish, Russian and German ethnicity.

Russia began attempting to lure Romanian settlers (mostly from Moldavia, but also from Transylvania, Bukovina and Muntenia) to settle in its territory in 1775, after it gained the largely uninhabited territory between the Dnieper and the Bug. But the colonization was to be in a larger scale after 1792/3, to Transnistria and beyond, when the Russian government declared that the region of steppes without population between the Dniester and the Southern Bug was to become a new principality named "New Moldavia", under Russian suzerainty.

Indeed, the colonization had reached in the previous century the Kyiv area (then known as New Serbia) and in 1712 even the Don river, with the Dimitrie Cantemir leadership.

Plots of tax-exempt land were distributed amongst Moldavian peasants, while 56 Moldavian boyars (belonging to famous families like Rosetti, Cantacuzino, Catargiu and Sturdza) received large estates which they helped colonize. Dozens of new villages were founded during this colonization stage, which lasted until 1812, when Russia annexed Bessarabia and Transnistria ceased to be a borderland.

In the 1890s there were the following fully Moldovan villages in the Bug river area: Iasca, Gradinita, Sevartaica, Belcauca (in the direction of Ovideopol), Malaiesti, Floarea, Tei, Cosarca, Buturul, Perperita, Goiana, Siclia, Corotna, Cioburceni, Speia, Caragaciu, Taslic, Dorotcaia, Voznisevsca (on the Bug), Moldovca si Cantacuzinovca. Indeed, in 1893 according to official data there were 532,416 Romanians in Kherson and Podolia, 11,813 – in Ecaterinoslav, and 4,015 in Tauridia (Crimea). But the real data were estimated up to more than one million.

1917–1924

During World War I, representatives of the Romanian speakers beyond the Dniester (who numbered 173,982 in the 1897 census) participated in the Bessarabian national movement in 1917/1918, asking for the incorporation of their territory in Greater Romania. Nevertheless, Romania ignored their request, as it would have required a large-scale military intervention.

At the end of World War I in 1918, the Directory of Ukraine proclaimed the sovereignty of the Ukrainian People's Republic over the left bank of the Dniester. After the Russian Civil War in 1922, the Ukrainian SSR was created.

Soviet Era

Moldavian Autonomous Republic in Soviet Ukraine

The geopolitical concept of an autonomous Communist Transnistrian region was born in 1924, when Bessarabian military leader Grigore Kotovski proposed the founding under the auspices of Moscow of the Moldavian Autonomous Oblast that months later became the Moldavian ASSR of Ukrainian SSR.

In 1927 there was a massive uprising of peasants and factory workers in Tiraspol and other cities (Mohyliv-Podilskyi, Kamianets-Podilskyi) of southern Ukrainian SSR against Soviet authorities. Troops from Moscow were sent to the region and suppressed the unrest, causing around 4,000 deaths, according to US correspondents sent to report about the insurrection, which was at the time completely denied by the Kremlin official press.

During the 1920s and 1930s, thousands of Romanian Transnistrians fled to Romania, the government of which set up a special Fund for their housing and education. A 1935 estimate puts the number of refugees to 20,000.
MASSR had a mixed Ukrainian (46%) and Moldovan (32%) population, which was estimated at 545,500. Its area was 8,677 km2 and included 11 raions on the left bank of Dniester.

Under Stalinist rule, populations who were not Ukrainian, Russian, or Romanian were pressured to Russify, and their numbers would decline further. After a brief initial period of liberalization and freedom, groups such as the Poles in the Soviet Union were subject to harassment, dispersal and mass terror. This trend increased in the late 1930s, as a result of the 1937-8 Polish Operation of the NKVD as well as the ceasing of educational instruction in the Moldavian ASSR for all non-Romanians populations in their native languages which was replaced by Ukrainian and Russian.

According to the 1926 Soviet census, the Republic had a population of 572,339, of which:

While the creation of ethnic-based autonomous polities was a general policy of the Soviets at that time, with the creation of the Moldavian ASSR, the Soviet Union also hoped  to bolster its claim to Bessarabia. Soviet authorities declared the "temporarily occupied city of Kishinev" as de jure capital of the ASSR. 
At that time, the population of Moldavian ASSR was 48% Ukrainian, 30% Romanian/Moldavian, 9% Russian, and 8.5% Jewish. In 1940, 6 of the 14 districts of MASSR were included in the new created Moldavian SSR, together with a part of Bessarabia.

According to the Soviet census of 1926, in the districts of Camenca, Rîbniţa, Dubăsari, Grigoriopol, Tiraspol and Slobozia, a territory roughly similar with today's Transnistria, there were 44,11% Moldavians (Romanians), 27,18% Ukrainians, 13,69% Russians, 8,21% Jews, 3,01% Germans etc.

World War II

The Moldavian SSR, which was set up by a decision of the Supreme Soviet of the USSR on 2 August 1940, was formed from a part of Bessarabia taken from Romania on June 28, following the Molotov-Ribbentrop pact, where the majority of the population were Romanian speakers, and a strip of land on the left bank of the Dniester in the Ukrainian SSR, which was transferred to it in 1940 (the strip being roughly equivalent to the territory of today's Transnistria).

In 1941, after Axis forces invaded Bessarabia in the course of the Second World War, they advanced over the Dniester river. Romania controlled the entire region between Dniester and Southern Bug rivers, including the city of Odessa, as Transnistria.

The territory — called Governatorate of Transnistria — with an area of 44,000 km2 and a population of 1.2 million inhabitants was divided into 13 counties: Ananiev, Balta, Berzovca, Dubasari, Golta, Jugastru, Movilau, Oceacov, Odessa, Ovidiopol, Ribnita, Tiraspol and Tulcin. There were in this enlarged Transnistria nearly 200,000 Romanian-speaking residents.

The Romanian administration of "Transnistria" attempted to stabilise the situation in the area under Romanian control. It was implemented a process of Romanianization. To this end, it opened all churches, previously closed down by the Soviets. In 1942–1943, 2,200 primary schools were organized in the region, including 1,677 Ukrainian, 311 Romanian, 150 Russian, 70 German and 6 Bulgarian. 117 middle and high schools were opened, including 65 middle schools, 29 technical high schools, and 23 academic high schools. Theaters were opened in Odessa and Tiraspol, as well as several museums, libraries, and cinemas throughout the region. On 7 December 1941, the "University of Odessa" was reopened with 6 faculties – medicine, polytechnical, law, sciences, languages and agricultural engineering.

The Romanians/Moldavians in Ukraine east of the Bug river were calculated by a German census to be nearly 800,000 (probably an excessive number), and were made plans to move them to Transnistria in 1942/43: but nothing was done.

Probably there were only about 100,000 Romanians/Moldavians in the German-occupied Ukraine – called Reichskommissariat Ukraine – and nearly all of them "disappeared" (because killed, escaped to Romania or deported to Siberia/Caucasus by Joseph Stalin), when the Soviets reconquered the area in early 1944.

Furthermore, by March 1943 a total of 185,000 Jews had been murdered under the Romanian and German occupation. This figure includes Romanian and Ukrainian Jews deported from Romania and Bessarabia, but also local Jews who were hunted down by the Einsatzgruppen killing squads.

The Soviet Union regained the area in spring 1944, when the Soviet Army advanced into the territory driving out the Axis forces. Many thousands of Romanians/Vlachs of Transnistria were killed in those months or deported to gulags in the following years

Moldavian SSR

The Moldavian SSR became the subject of a systematic policy of Russification. Cyrillic was made the official script for Moldavian. It had an official status in the republic, together with Russian, which was the language of "interethnic communication".

Most industry that was built in the Moldavian SSR was concentrated in Transnistria, while the rest of Moldavia had a predominantly agricultural economy. In 1990, Transnistria accounted for 40% of Moldavia's GDP and 90% of its electricity production.

The 14th Soviet army had been based there since 1956 and was kept there after the fall of the Soviet Union to safeguard what is probably the biggest weapons stockpile and ammunition depot in Europe, which was set up in Soviet times for possible operations on the Southeastern Theater in the event of World War III. Russia was negotiating with the Republic of Moldova, Transnistria and Ukraine for transit rights to be able to evacuate the military materiel back to Russia. In 1994, the 14th Army headquarters were moved from Moldovan capital Chișinău to Tiraspol.

Dissolution of the Soviet Union

Mikhail Gorbachev's policy of perestroika in the Soviet Union allowed the political liberalisation at the regional level in 1980s. The incomplete democratisation was preliminary for the exclusivist nationalism to become the most dynamic political force. Some national minorities opposed these changes in the Moldavian political class of the republic, since during Soviet times, local politics had often been dominated by non-Romanians, particularly by those of Russian origin. The language laws — introducing the Latin alphabet for written Moldavian and requiring proficiency in the Moldavian language (essentially—some would say exactly—the Romanian language) for public servants— presented a particularly volatile issue as a great proportion of the non-Romanian population of the Moldavian SSR did not speak Moldavian. The problem of official languages in the Republic of Moldova has become a Gordian knot, being exaggerated and, perhaps, intentionally politicized. This displeasure with the new policies was manifested in a more visible way in Transnistria, where urban centers such as Tiraspol, had a Slavic majority. The scenes of protests against the central government of the republic were more acute here.

According to the census in 1989, the population in Transnistria was 39.9% Moldavian, 28.3% Ukrainian, 25.4% Russian, 1.9% Bulgarian.

War of Transnistria

On 2 September 1990, the Pridnestrovian Moldavian Soviet Socialist Republic was unilaterally proclaimed as a Soviet Republic separate from Moldova by the "Second Congress of the Peoples' Representatives of Pridnestrovie". However, on 22 December, the Soviet President Mikhail Gorbachev signed a decree "regarding the measures that would bring the situation back to normal in the Moldavian SSR". The decision stated that the proclamation of the Pridnestrovian Moldavian SSR was null and void. On 25 August 1991, the Supreme Council of the PMSSR adopted the declaration of independence of the republic. On 27 August 1991, the Moldovan Parliament adopted the Declaration of Independence of the Republic of Moldova, whose territory included Transnistria. The Moldovan Parliament asked the Government of the Soviet Union "to begin negotiations with the Moldovan Government in order to put an end to the illegal occupation of the Republic of Moldova and withdraw Soviet troops from Moldovan territory".

Moldovan forces entered Dubăsari in order to separate Transnistria into two halves, but were stopped by the city's inhabitants, who had blocked the bridge over the Dniester, at Lunga. In an attempt to break through the roadblock, Moldovan forces then opened fire. In the course of the confrontation, three Dubăsari locals, Oleg Geletiuk, Vladimir Gotkas and Valerie Mitsuls, were killed by the Moldovan forces and sixteen people wounded.

A second Moldovan attempt to cross the Lunga bridge took place on 13 December 1991. As a result of the fighting, 27 PMR troops were taken prisoner and four Moldovan troops (Ghenadie Iablocikin, Gheorghe Cașu, Valentin Mereniuk and Mihai Arnăut) were killed, without Moldova being able to cross the bridge. After this second failed attempt, there was a lull in military activity until 2 March 1992.

After Moldova became a member of the United Nations on 2 March 1992, Moldovan President Mircea Snegur (president from 1990 to 1996) authorized concerted military action against PMR forces which had been attacking police outposts loyal to the Moldovan government on the left bank of the river Dniester (Nistru), and on a smaller section of the right bank around the southern city of Tighina (Bender/Bendery). The PMR forces, aided by contingents of Russian Cossacks and the Russian 14th Army, consolidated their control over most of the disputed area.

Forces of the 14th Army (which had owed allegiance to the Soviet Union, Commonwealth of Independent States (CIS) and the Russian Federation in turn) stationed in Transnistria, had fought with and on behalf of the PMR side. PMR units were able to arm themselves with weapons taken from the stores of the former 14th Army. The Russian 14th Army's role in the area was crucial to the outcome of the war. The Moldovan army was in a position of inferiority which prevented it from regaining control of Transnistria. A cease-fire agreement was signed on 21 July 1992.

The deadlock

Aftermath of the war

Despite the ceasefire agreement, Russia had continued to provide military, political and economic support to the PMR, thus enabling it not only to survive but to strengthen itself and acquire a certain amount of autonomy from Moldova. General Aleksandr Lebed, the commander of the Russian Operational Group (the former Russian 14th Army) since June 1992, who acted as a Transnistrian politician, said many times that his army was able to reach Bucharest in two hours. In the security zone controlled by the Russian military forces, the Transnistrian government continued to deploy its troops and to manufacture and sell weapons in breach of the agreement of 21 July 1992. In February 2003, the USA and the European Union imposed visa restrictions against the Transnistrian leadership.

Although only 2,600 troops of the Russian 14th Army remain in the operational group, their presence has been used by Russia as an instrument of influence over the region.

The agreement to withdraw all Russian forces was signed in 1994, but while the number of troops decreased, an immense stockpile of ammunition and equipment remained. The arsenal of the former 14th Army consists of 49,476 firearms, 805 artillery guns, 4,000 cars, and 655 units of various military equipment, which is enough to arm four rifle divisions.

The OSCE is trying to facilitate a negotiated settlement and has had an observer mission in place for several years. The Russian army was still stationed in Moldovan territory in breach of the undertakings to withdraw them completely given by Russia at the OSCE summits in 1999 and 2001.

1997 Moscow memorandum on the "common state"
On 8 May 1997 – with the mediation of the Russian Federation, Ukraine and the OSCE Mission in Moldova – the Moldovan President Petru Lucinschi and the Transniestrian President Igor Smirnov, signed, in Moscow, the "Memorandum on the principles of normalizations of the relations between the Republic of Moldova and Transdniestria" also known as the 1997 Moscow memorandum or the Primakov memorandum.

In compliance with the final clause of the memorandum, the relations between the Republic of Moldova and Transdniestria shall be developed within the framework of a common state, within the borders of Soviet Moldova. The Russian Federation and Ukraine stated their readiness to become guarantors of the Transdnestrian status observance, as well as of the Memorandum's provisions. Chişinău and Tiraspol have decided to sustain the establishment of legal and state relations: the mutual decision coordination, inclusively regarding prerogatives, delimitation and delegation, the safeguard of mutual security, and Transnistrian participation in the process of accomplishment of the foreign policy of the Republic of Moldova. At the same time, Transdniestria gained the right, subject to mutual agreement, to independently establish and maintain international connections in such fields as economy, science, technologies and culture. The Memorandum provisions had widely diverging legal and political interpretations in Chişinău and Tiraspol.

The Kozak Memorandum

In July 2002, OSCE, Russian, and Ukrainian mediators approved a document setting forth a blueprint for reuniting Moldova under a federal system. However, the fundamental disagreements over the division of powers remained, which rendered the settlement elusive.

In mid-November 2003, Russia unexpectedly provided a much more detailed memorandum proposing a united asymmetric federal Moldavian state with an attached key proposal to locate a Russian military base on Moldavian soil for the next 20 years. First published in Russian on the website of Transnistria's Ministry of Foreign Affairs, the text was promoted by a Russian politician Dmitry Kozak, known to be a close ally of President Vladimir Putin and one of the key figures in his presidential team. The memorandum presented an end to the previous Moscow policy, which assumed that the region would have equal status in federation with the rest of the country.

It was proposed that the competences of government of the federal Moldova would be divided into three categories: those of the federation, those of individual subjects and those of joint competences. The plan presented several issues risking to cause blockage in policy-making. A lower house, elected by proportional representation, would pass legislation by simple majority. All laws would also need the assent of the senate, however, whose representation would be highly disproportionate with respect to population figures: 13 senators elected by the federal lower house, nine by Transnistria and four by Gagauzia. According to the 1989 census, Transnistria had 14% and Gagauzia 3.5% of Moldova's total population. By this plan, Transnistria would be an outright blocking minority.

Large demonstrations against the Kozak memorandum took place in Chişinău in the days following the publication of the Russian proposal. Moldova's leadership declined to sign memorandum without the coordination with the European organizations. A visit by President Putin to Moldova was cancelled. Later in 2005, President Vladimir Voronin made a statement rejecting the 2003 Kozak memorandum because of contradiction with the Moldovan constitution which defines Moldova as a neutral state and could not allow any foreign troops on its soil, while the country cannot join military alliances. Moldova and the Kozak memorandum was a key issue at the OSCE ministerial meeting in Maastricht in December 2003, and disagreement between Russia on the one hand, and the EU and the US on the other on Moldova, was one of the principal reasons why a final joint declaration was not adopted after the meeting.

2004 crisis

In the summer of 2004, a crisis erupted over the issue of Romanian-language schools in Transnistria. It led to a breakdown in negotiations and economic retaliations by both sides. The issue was resolved by compromise: The PMR government gave the schools autonomy and the schools formalized their registration with the PMR Ministry of Education.

Ukraine-sponsored talks
In May 2005, the Ukrainian government of Viktor Yushchenko proposed a seven-point plan by which the separation of Transnistria and Moldova would be settled through a negotiated settlement and free elections.  Under the plan, Transnistria would remain an autonomous region of Moldova.  The United States, the EU and the PMR itself expressed some level of agreement with the project.

In July, Ukraine opened five new customs posts on the PMR-Ukraine border.  The posts, staffed by both Moldovan and Ukrainian officials, are intended to reduce the hitherto high incidence of smuggling between the breakaway state and its neighbors.

5+2 negotiation format

Beginning in 2005, multilateral talks were held on the subject of Transnistria. The 5+2 in the name refer to Moldova, Transnistria, Ukraine, Organization for Security and Co-operation in Europe and Russia, plus the European Union and the United States as external observers.

The talks proved to be a failure. They restarted in February 2011, in Vienna.

In April 2011 Russia agreed theoretically to create an autonomous region of Transnistria inside the Republic of Moldova, but there were many other problems to be solved in the talks.

Russian invasion of Ukraine 

After the annexation of the Crimea by Russia in March 2014, the head of the Transnistrian parliament asked to join Russia.

On April 26, 2022, authorities from the Transnistria region said two transmitting antennas broadcasting Russian radio programs at Grigoriopol transmitter broadcasting facility near the town of Maiac in the Grigoriopol District near the Ukrainian border had been blown up and the previous evening, the premises of the Transnistrian state security service had been attacked. Observers feared targeted provocations to give Russia an excuse to intervene in Moldova. The Russian army has a military base and a large ammunition dump in the region. Russia has about 1,500 soldiers stationed in breakaway Transnistria. They are supposed to serve there as peacekeepers.

Notes

See also 
 War of Transnistria
 Disputed status of Transnistria
 Transnistrian border customs issues
 Crime in Transnistria
 International recognition of Transnistria
 Republic of Moldova

References
  see Chapter 4
 
 
 Dallin, Alexander.  Odessa, 1941–1944: A Case Study of Soviet Territory Under Foreign Rule. Iasi-Oxford-Portland: Center for Romanian Studies. Oxford, 1998   
 Ion Nistor, Vechimea aşezărilor româneşti dincolo de Nistru, București: Monitorul  şi Imprimeriile Statului, Imprimeria Naţională, 1939
 John Mackinlay and Peter Cross (editors), Regional Peacekeepers: The Paradox of Russian Peacekeeping, United Nations University Press, 2003, 
 Charles King, The Moldovans: Romania, Russia, and the Politics of Culture, Hoover Institution Press, 2000
 Dareg Zabarah Nation- and Statehood in Moldova: Ideological and political dynamics since the 1980s, Harrasowitz Verlag (Balkanologische Veröffentlichungen No: 53), 2011
 Casu, Igor.  Dusmanul de clasa. Represiuni politice, violenta si rezistenta in R(A)SS Moldoveneasca, 1924-1956. Chisinau: CARTIER, 2014, chapters 1-3 (on Great Terror available in Romanian and Russian at Igor Casu | State University of Moldova - Academia.edu).

External links 
 Pridnestrovie.net history section  (Official Transnistrian site)
 History of creation and development of the Parliament of the Pridnestrovian Moldavian Republic (PMR)
 Video of Transnistria

 

sv:Transnistrien#Historia